Zaitoon Bano (18 June 1938  14 September 2021), also spelled Zaitun Banu, was a Pakistani poet, short story writer, novelist, broadcaster, and advocate of women's rights in Khyber Pakhtunkhwa. She primarily wrote in Pashto and Urdu languages. Sometimes, she was referred to as Khatun-e-Awal (the first lady) or "first lady of Pashto fiction", an honorary title awarded to her in recognition of her contribution to women's rights of Pashtuns. She wrote over twenty-four books, including her first short story titled Hindara (Mirror) which appears one of the prominent writings of Pashto language.

She was born to Pir Syed Sultan Mahmood Shah in Sufaid Dheri village of Peshawar, Pakistan. She married Taj Saeed and was the granddaughter of Pir Syed Abdul Qudus Tundar, a Pashto poet. She is sometimes referred to as the first Pashto literati to have addressed the social issues of Pashtun women through her writings.

Education and background 
Zaitoon received her primary schooling and matriculation from a city school, and later obtained a master's degree from the Islamia College University in Pashto and Urdu as a private student. After completing her education, she taught at various educational institutions, and later joined Pakistan Broadcasting Corporation where she served as a producer. Prior to debuting in writings, she was associated with the Radio Pakistan and Pakistan Television Corporation, a state-owned Television channel.

Literary career 
Bano began her career in 1958 when she was studying in ninth grade with her first short story titled Hindara (Mirror). Between 1958 and 2008, she wrote fiction books and short stories in Urdu and Pashto languages. Her publications include Maat Bangree, Khoboona (1958), Juandi Ghamoona (1958), Berge Arzoo (1980), and Waqt Kee Dehleez Par (1980). Among other publications she published short stories titled Da Shagu Mazal (A Journey Through Aands) written between 1958 and 2017. She wrote only one poetry collection in Pashto titled Manjeela (head cushion) which was published in 2006. Besides writing, she is also credited with having contributed to numerous radio and television plays.

Work

Death 
She died on 14 September 2021 at the Lady Reading Hospital in Peshawar, Pakistan following her chronic condition.

Awards and accolades 
Zaitoon was awarded fifteen national literary awards including the Pride of Performance and Fakhr-i- Peshawar award in recognition of her contribution to Pashto and Urdu fiction. In 2016, a panel of the Sustainable Development Goals, awarded her an honorary title Khatun-e-Awal (first lady) or "first lady of Pashto fiction" during the International Women’s Day celebration in recognition of her service to the women's rights in Khyber Pakhtunkhwa.

References

Notes

1938 births
2021 deaths
People from Peshawar
Islamia College University alumni
Pashto-language writers
Urdu-language writers from Pakistan
Pakistani women short story writers
Pakistani short story writers
Pakistani feminist writers
20th-century Pakistani women writers
21st-century Pakistani women writers
Pakistani women poets
20th-century Pakistani poets
21st-century Pakistani poets
Pakistani women's rights activists
Recipients of the Pride of Performance